The Lost Hills Oil Field is a large oil field in the Lost Hills Range, north of the town of Lost Hills in western Kern County, California, in the United States.

Production
While only the 18th-largest oil field in California in size, in total remaining reserves it ranks sixth, with the equivalent of over  producible reserves still in the ground, according to the California Division of Oil, Gas and Geothermal Resources (Chevron Corp., the principal operator, estimates considerably more oil in the ground). Production at Lost Hills has been increasing steadily: as of the end of 2006, it was California's second fastest-growing oil field, exceeded only by the nearby Cymric Field.

The Lost Hills field also contains considerable reserves of natural gas.

Setting

The Lost Hills Field underlies a long, low range of southeast-to-northwest trending hills of the same name adjacent to the San Joaquin Valley. The California Aqueduct runs adjacent to the field boundary on the northeast, and the town of Lost Hills is on the other side of the aqueduct along California State Route 46, which passes through the field from east to west.

The climate in the Lost Hills area is arid to semi-arid, with an average rainfall of   a year, almost all in the winter months. Vegetation in the vicinity of the field is mostly grassland and sparse scrub, with some adjacent orchards, although in the oil field itself most vegetation has been removed from the areas of active operations.

Geology

The Lost Hills Field is one of a series of oil fields along anticlines between the Coalinga Oil Field on the north and the Midway-Sunset Field on the south, along the western edge of the San Joaquin Valley. These anticlines run closely parallel to the San Andreas Fault to the west, and formed as a result of compression from tectonic movement. The Lost Hills Field occupies a portion of a SE-plunging anticline. There are six oil pools in the five producing units, which are, from the top, the Tulare Formation, of Pleistocene age; the Etchegoin Formation, of Pliocene age; the Reef Ridge Shale, McClure Shale, and Devilwater Shale, members of the Monterey Formation, of Miocene age, which can be found in much of coastal California; and the Temblor formation, underneath the others, of Oligocene and Miocene age.

The Belridge Diatomite portion of the Monterey Formation defines the productive limits of the field. Characteristic of this rock unit is that it is full of oil – almost 50% of the unit is saturated, and the unit has high porosity, in the 45% to 70% range – but very little of the oil has been recoverable from the unit (only three to four percent so far). The oil in place is about twenty times greater than the California Department of Oil and Gas reserves estimate, which is volume that can be economically produced.

Well spacing on Lost Hills varies based on the geologic characteristics in the unit being drilled, with one well per  in siliceous shale to one well per  in diatomite.

A peculiarity of the Lost Hills operations is the pronounced subsidence of the ground surface as it collapses into the area vacated by the petroleum after being pumped out. The dropping land surface causes operational problems, including fractures of well casings, and sometimes complete well failures. Waterflooding – the practice of filling the reservoir with water to push petroleum to recovery wells, and thereby also reoccupying the space vacated by oil and gas – has partially mitigated the problem. Yet another Getty well suffered the same fate in 1978.

History and operations
Drillers Martin and Dudley accidentally discovered the Lost Hills Oil Field in July 1910. Other drillers, encouraged by the find, including the mighty Standard Oil of California, which had recently been subject to antitrust litigation and broken up by the Supreme Court, began drilling for more nearby; they soon found the Cahn and Reef Ridge pools, in 1913, and then the Tulare pool in 1915. There were relatively few wells on the field for the first several decades; indeed, by 1979, there were only 39 wells producing from the Monterey Formation, and each of these wells only produced an average of eight barrels per day. It took the development of advanced recovery technology to turn the Lost Hills into a high-producing oil field.

Unusual for a California oil field, the years of maximum recovery were not early in the 20th century, but recently: peak oil production from the Etchegoin Pool did not occur until the early 21st century, assisted by several enhanced recovery technologies, including water flooding and cyclic steam flooding. During that year it had the fourth-largest production increase in the state, and preliminary estimates for 2007 show that production has increased yet again, to 

As of 1997, four pools – the Tulare, Etchegoin, Cahn, and Reef Ridge – continued to have active recovery operations using waterflooding, steam flooding, and fire flooding. As of 2008, the principal operators on the Lost Hills Field were Chevron Corp. and Aera Energy LLC.

Bellevue blowout

In 1998, the Lost Hills Field was the site of one of the largest and most spectacular well blowouts in modern U.S. history. The Bellevue blowout – also called the "Bellevue gusher" – involved six months of uncontrolled natural gas expulsion, and a gigantic gas fire that lasted two weeks.

Natural gas and petroleum condensate burst from the well, immediately exploding into flame, knocking over the massive drilling rig, destroying the trailer, and melting the nearby drilling equipment. It burned for fourteen days, and continued spewing even after the fire was out; only a secondary well bore, drilled at a slant to intercept the main well, was able to plug the opening and snuff the blowout at last.

References
 California Oil and Gas Fields, Volumes I, II and III.  Vol. I (1998), Vol. II (1992), Vol. III (1982).  California Department of Conservation, Division of Oil, Gas, and Geothermal Resources (DOGGR).  1,472 pp. Lost Hills Field information pp. 256–259. PDF file available on CD from www.consrv.ca.gov.
 California Department of Conservation, Oil and Gas Statistics, Annual Report, December 31, 2006.
 Paul E. Land, Lost Hills Oil Field.  California Division of Oil and Gas.  Sacramento, 1984 and 1990.  Available on the web at their FTP site.

External links

San Joaquin Geological Society: Oil history in Kern County
Pictures and description of the 1998 Bellevue Blowout

Notes

Natural gas fields in the United States
Oil fields in Kern County, California
Oil fields in California
San Joaquin Valley